Fire & Snow is the debut album of Australian singer songwriter Mandyleigh Storm. This album was crowdfunded through Sellaband. The album was recorded by Mick Glossop and Ben Roulston and Dean Street Studios, London, mixed by Mick Glossop at Magazine Studios, London, and mastered by Kevin Metcalfe at Sound Masters Studio, London.

Track listing

The limited edition version of this album contains the following additional content:

 Same Time Tomorrow (demo mp3 – live)
 Tonight (demo mp3 – live)
 Grey (blues version mp3 – live)
 Go With It (vocals in .wav format)
 Keep The Silence (vocals in .wav format)
 Interview with Mandyleigh Storm (video)

Personnel
 Mandyleigh Storm – Vocals
 Johnny Scott – Guitar
 Liam Genockey – Drums
 Tim Harries – Bass
 James Lascelles – Keyboards, percussion, dulcimer

2008 debut albums